Pubudu Wickrama (born 28 December 1980) is a Sri Lankan former cricketer. He played in 70 first-class and 41 List A matches between 1997/98 and 2008/09. He made his Twenty20 debut on 17 August 2004, for Sri Lanka Air Force Sports Club in the 2004 SLC Twenty20 Tournament.

References

External links
 

1980 births
Living people
Sri Lankan cricketers
Panadura Sports Club cricketers
Sri Lanka Air Force Sports Club cricketers
Place of birth missing (living people)